Kerabari is a Village Development Committee in Gorkha District in the Gandaki Zone of northern-central Nepal. At the time of the 1991 Nepal census it had a population of 2,692 and had 535 houses in the village

References

Populated places in Gorkha District